The American Association of Variable Star Observers (AAVSO) is an international nonprofit organization. Founded in 1911, the organization focuses on coordinating, analyzing, publishing, and archiving variable star observations made largely by amateur astronomers. The AAVSO creates records that establish light curves depicting the variation in brightness of a star over time. The AAVSO makes the records available to professional astronomers, researchers, and educators.

Professional astronomers do not have the resources to monitor every variable star. Therefore, astronomy is one of the few sciences where amateurs can make genuine contributions to scientific research.  In 2011, the 100th year of the AAVSO's existence, the twenty-millionth variable star observation was received into their database. The AAVSO International Database (AID) has stored over thirty-five million observations as of 2019. The organization receives nearly 1,000,000 observations annually from around 2,000 professional and amateur observers, and is quoted regularly in scientific journals.

The AAVSO is also very active in education and public outreach. They routinely hold training workshops for citizen science and publish papers with amateurs as co-authors. In the 1990s, the AAVSO developed the Hands-On Astrophysics curriculum, now known as Variable Star Astronomy (with support from the National Science Foundation [NSF]). In 2009, the AAVSO was awarded a three-year $800,000 grant from the NSF to run Citizen Sky, a pro-am collaboration project examining the 2009-2011 eclipse of the star epsilon Aurigae.

As of September 16, 2022, the Executive Director of the AAVSO is Brian Kloppenborg. Before him was Kathy Spirer for nine months, after Styliani ("Stella") Kafka -who was in charge between February 2015 and the end of 2021(resigned). She succeeded Arne Henden. The previous director of the AAVSO for many decades was Janet Mattei, who died in March 2004 of leukemia.

The AAVSO headquarters were originally located at the residence of its founder William T. Olcott in Norwich, Connecticut. 

After AAVSO's incorporation in 1918, it unofficially moved to Harvard College Observatory, which later officially served as the AAVSO headquarters (1931–1953). Thereafter, it moved around Cambridge before their first building was purchased (1985) - The Clinton B. Ford Astronomical Data and Research Center. In 2007, the AAVSO purchased and moved into the recently vacated premises of Sky & Telescope magazine.

Minor Planet (8900) AAVSO is named after the organization.

Current and former members
Recorders and Directors

Presidents  

Other members
The AAVSO currently has over 2,000 members and observers, with approximately half of them from outside the United States. This list only consists of those with Wikipedia pages.

Publications
 AAVSO Alert Notice.
 Journal of the American Association of Variable Star Observers (JAAVSO).
 AAVSO Circular was published from 1970 until 2000 and edited by John E. Bortle.

See also
 List of astronomical societies

References

External links
AAVSO website
The International Variable Star Index (VSX)
History of the AAVSO
Amateur Astronomy Reaches New Heights Space.com, June 28, 2000
A New Foundation for the AAVSO article in the January 2007 issue of Sky & Telescope magazine
Red Hot News… Possible Nova in Sagittarius! Universe Today, August 9, 2009
 100 Years of Citizen Science (1 December 2010)

Harvard University
Amateur astronomy organizations
Astronomy organizations
Variable stars
1911 establishments in the United States
Scientific organizations established in 1911